Courval is an unincorporated community in the Rural Municipality of Rodgers No. 133 in the Canadian province of Saskatchewan. Recognized as a designated place by Statistics Canada, Courval had a population of 5 in the Canada 2006 Census.

Demographics

Climate

See also

 List of communities in Saskatchewan
 List of ghost towns in Saskatchewan

References

Former designated places in Saskatchewan
Unincorporated communities in Saskatchewan
Rodgers No. 133, Saskatchewan